Saint-Paulin is a municipality in the Mauricie region of the province of Quebec in Canada.

Demographics
Population trend:
 Population in 2011: 1534 (2006 to 2011 population change: -5.4%)
 Population in 2006: 1622
 Population in 2001: 1576
 Population in 1996: 1599
 Population in 1991: 1556

Private dwellings occupied by usual residents: 677 (total dwellings: 744)

Mother tongue:
 English as first language: 0%
 French as first language: 98%
 English and French as first language: 0%
 Other as first language: 2%

References

Incorporated places in Mauricie
Municipalities in Quebec
Designated places in Quebec